Boronia safrolifera, commonly known as safrole boronia, is a species of flowering plant that is endemic to eastern Australia. It is an erect, woody shrub with pinnate leaves that have up to nineteen leaflets, and white to pink, four-petalled flowers.

Description
The lower side of the leaflet is a paler shade of green. The eight stamens are usually hairy and the stigma is about the same width as the style.

Taxonomy and naming
Boronia safrolifera was first formally described in 1924 by Edwin Cheel and the description was published in Journal and Proceedings of the Royal Society of New South Wales. The specific epithet (safrolifera) refers to the odour of the volatile oil safrole apparently released from the crushed leaves of this plant. The ending -fera is a Latin suffix meaning "to carry" or "to bear".

Distribution and habitat
Safrole boronia grows around the margins of swamps in near-coastal areas of New South Wales north from Port Stephens to Bribie Island in south-eastern Queensland.

References

External links

safrolifera
Flora of New South Wales
Flora of Queensland
Plants described in 1924
Taxa named by Edwin Cheel